Staroye is a rural locality (a selo) in Vysokovskoye Rural Settlement, Ust-Kubinsky District, Vologda Oblast, Russia. The population was 64 as of 2002. There are 2 streets.

Geography 
The distance to Ustye is 28.5 km, to Vysokoye is 18 km. Zaborye is the nearest rural locality.

References 

Rural localities in Ust-Kubinsky District